Andrea Mátay (born 27 September 1955 in Budapest) is a retired Hungarian high jumper. Her outdoor personal best jump was 1.94 metres, achieved in September 1979 in Mexico City. She had 1.98 m on the indoor track, from February 1979 in Budapest. It was a world indoor record.  She won two medals at the European Indoor Championships. She became Hungarian champion in 1973, 1975, 1977, 1978, 1979 and 1985.

She was named Hungarian Sportswoman of The Year in 1979 after having won the European Indoor Championships and the Summer Universiade the same year.

International competitions

References

External links

1955 births
Living people
Hungarian female high jumpers
Athletes from Budapest
Athletes (track and field) at the 1976 Summer Olympics
Athletes (track and field) at the 1980 Summer Olympics
Olympic athletes of Hungary
Universiade medalists in athletics (track and field)
Universiade gold medalists for Hungary
Medalists at the 1979 Summer Universiade
20th-century Hungarian women
21st-century Hungarian women